Minden High School serves 9th to 12th grade students in Webster Parish, Louisiana. The school in Minden, Louisiana was preceded by Minden Academy. It is part of the Minden School District. 

According to U.S. News the school's student body was approximately 55 percent African American and 42 percent white in 2020.

History
S. R. Emmons was principal in 1938. The Library of Congress has a photo of the school from the early 20th century.

At one point in school history, the football team wore green and white and were known as the Greenbacks.

Students who graduated from 1962 to 1966 were part of a study.

Webster High School which served African American students was consolidated into it. Harlem Globetrotter Louis Dunbar graduated from Webster High.

Athletics
Minden High athletics competes in the LHSAA. The school's teams compete as the Crimson Tide and crimson and white are the school colors.

Championships
Football championships
(5) State Championships: 1938, 1954, 1956, 1963, 1980

The school has won five football state championships and also baseball state championships.

Alumni

Artists
 David Snell, journalist and cartoonist
 Barbara Colley, novelist

Politicians and judges
 Bruce M. Bolin, judge and state legislator
 Jerry Huckaby, state legislator 
 Robert Floyd Kennon, Louisiana Supreme Court justice and governor of Louisiana
 R. Harmon Drew Sr., state legislator 
 R. Harmon Drew Jr., judge
 J. D. Batton, sheriff

Football players
 Larry Clinton Brewer, Louisiana Tech wide receiver; a back injury derailed his pro career.
 Ken Beck
 Pat Coffee
 Sammy Odom
 Charley Hennigan
 Clyde Williams (Webster High School)
 David Lee, punter for former Baltimore Colts from 1967 to 1971
 James Britt
 Darryl Moore
 L'Jarius Sneed
 Stepfret Williams
 Kenyon Cotton

Other athletes
 Jimmy Upton, track
 Jackie Moreland (1938 - 1971), basketball

References

Public high schools in Louisiana
Schools in Webster Parish, Louisiana